The 1958 Northern Ireland general election was called on 27 February by 1st Viscount Brookeborough to be held on 20 March 1958.

Like all previous elections to the Parliament of Northern Ireland, it produced a large majority for the Ulster Unionist Party. The Northern Ireland Labour Party returned to the Commons after being wiped out in the 1949 election.

Campaign 
Announcing the election, Viscount Brookeborough remarked that the election would be on the Border issue once more, noting that this was the ninth election on the same issue. Unemployment was also an issue in the election with 50,000 people out of work in the province in that year.

Results

|}

Electorate: 891,064 (359,816 in contested seats); Turnout: 67.1% (241,501).

Votes summary

Seats summary

See also
List of members of the 9th House of Commons of Northern Ireland

References

Northern Ireland Parliamentary Election Results 

1958
Northern Ireland general election
Northern Ireland general election
General election